Four ships of the Royal Navy have borne the name HMS Empress:
 HMS Empress was previously the 91-gun screw powered second rate .  She was renamed HMS Empress in 1891, on her conversion to a training ship.  She was sold in 1923.
  was a tender, transferred from the War Department in 1906.  She was renamed HMS Heron later that year and was sold in 1923.
  was a seaplane tender, originally launched as a merchant in 1907.  She was requisitioned by the Navy between 1914 and 1919.
  was an escort carrier, originally USS Carnegie.  She was transferred to the Royal Navy in 1943, and returned to the US Navy in 1946.

See also
  was a storeship purchased in 1799 and sunk in 1804 as a breakwater.
  was a  launched in 1891 and sunk as a target in 1913.

Royal Navy ship names